Musschia wollastonii is a species of flowering plant in the Campanulaceae family.

References 

Campanuloideae
Taxa named by Richard Thomas Lowe
Plants described in 1856